My Old Dutch is a 1926 American silent drama film directed by Laurence Trimble and starring May McAvoy and Pat O'Malley. It was produced and distributed by Universal Pictures. Trimble had directed a 1915 British version of My Old Dutch that was also released by Universal.

Cast

Production
Director Laurence Trimble initiated a remake of his own 1915 British version of My Old Dutch to feature its star, Florence Turner. Actor James Morrison remembered Trimble telling him that Turner wished to get back into films, and asking him to help in a screen test that he could show to Universal Pictures. "He got a little company together—the people who were in it worked for nothing, because we loved Flotie—and we did scenes from My Old Dutch," Morrison recalled. Universal approved the project but cast May McAvoy, not Turner, in the starring role.

Preservation
A print of My Old Dutch is held in the collection of Indiana University.

References

External links

Lobby poster

1926 films
American silent feature films
Films directed by Laurence Trimble
Universal Pictures films
American films based on plays
1926 romantic drama films
American black-and-white films
Films set in London
American romantic drama films
American remakes of British films
1920s American films
Silent romantic drama films
Silent American drama films